Saint-Sylvain is a commune in the Seine-Maritime department in the Normandy region in northern France.

Geography
Huge chalk cliffs rise up from the pebbly beach and overlook the English Channel, forming the northern border of the commune's territory.

Heraldry

Population

Places of interest
 The church of St.Silvain, dating from the thirteenth century.
 A sixteenth-century stone cross.
 The thirteenth-century château of Anglesqueville-les-Mur.

See also
Communes of the Seine-Maritime department

References

Communes of Seine-Maritime